Sunflower is a Sri Lankan pop band  established in the early 1980s, led by Neil Warnakulasooriya. The band's name, "Sunflower" was reportedly given by veteran Sri Lankan musician, Clarence Wijewardena.

Career
Sunflower performed their first show on 4 September 1983 in Dankotuwa. The original band consisted of Neil Warnakulasooriya, Nelson Vas, Ivor de Mel,Erny peiris,Christopher liyanage,Lushan alahakoon and Athula Adhikari.

Members

Current
 Chalana Piumantha – guitar
 Dilantha Dias  – keyboards
 Saraa - drums
 Sudath Nawalage – vocals, rhythm guitar
 Shirantha Fernando – bass guitar
 Chaminda hettiarachchi – octapad
 Nelson Vaas – vocals
 Kasun Chamikara – vocals
 Jagath Sohantha - vocals

Former
 Ivor de Mel - rhythm guitar, bass guitar, vocals
 Erny Peiris – bass guitar, vocals
 Gayan Fernando - bass guitar
 Mahinda Silva - drums, vocals
 Paul Fernando -saxophone
 Marlon Dileepa Fernando - bass guitar
 Manjula Gamage – lead guitar, vocals
 Christopher Liyanage - vocals
 Noel Raj – vocals
 Ruwan Bandara - vocals, rhythm guitar, darabouka
 Athula Adikari – keyboards, vocals
 Anton Perera  – keyboards
 Lucien Alahakoon - drums
 Mahinda Silva – drums
 Roshan Perera – drums
 Sujith Marasinghe - octapad, darabouka
 Indika Kalugama - vocals
 Roshan Thisera - keyboards
 Prabath Thamel - drums
 Shirantha Fernando - bass guitar
 Suranga-vocals
 Dangamuwa - Vocals
 Suresh-bass guitar
 Dinesh Dissanayake - keyboards
 Bob Koko
 Amila - drums
 Anuruddha perera-octapad

References

External links

Sri Lankan musical groups